B major (or the key of B) is a major scale based on B. The pitches B, C, D, E, F, G, and A are all part of the B major scale. Its key signature has five sharps. Its relative minor is G-sharp minor, its parallel minor is B minor, and its enharmonic equivalent is C-flat major.

The B major scale is:

Although B major is usually considered a remote key (due to its distance from C major in the circle of fifths and fairly large number of sharps), Frédéric Chopin regarded its scale as the easiest of all to play on the piano, as its black notes fit the natural positions of the fingers well; as a consequence he often assigned it first to beginning piano students, leaving the scale of C major until last because he considered it the hardest of all scales to play completely evenly (because of its complete lack of black notes).

Few large-scale works in B major exist: these include Haydn's Symphony No. 46. The aria "La donna è mobile" from Verdi's opera Rigoletto is in the key, as is the "Flower Duet" from Lakmé. Brahms's Piano Trio No. 1, Op. 8, is in B major, though the piece ends in B minor. Brahms also wrote the slow movement to his Second Symphony in B major, as well as the fourth and last piece of the Ballades, Op. 10. The second movement of Beethoven's Piano Concerto No. 5 "Emperor" is in B major. The "Tuileries" movement from Mussorgsky's Pictures at an Exhibition is in the key. Tchaikovsky's Manfred Symphony in B minor ends in B major.

See also
Major and minor
List of symphonies in B major

References

External links
 

Musical keys
Major scales